Lenna is a standard test image used in image processing.

Lenna may also refer to:

People
Lenna (name), given name or a surname
Lenna Arnold (1920–2010), American baseball player
Lenna Bradburn (born 1960), Canadian executive
Lena Forsén (born 1951), Swedish model, subject of the Lenna test image
Lenna Kuurmaa (born 1985), Estonian singer
Lenna (album), 2010 album by Lenna Kuurmaa
Reginald Lenna (1912–2000), American businessman

Places
Lenna, Lombardy, Italy
Lenna, Oklahoma, United States
Lenna, old spelling of Länna, Uppsala Municipality, Sweden
Lenna Strait, in West Papua, Indonesia

Characters 
 Lenna Charlotte Tycoon

See also
Lena (disambiguation)
Lanna (disambiguation)
Linna (disambiguation)